Celso Otero Quintás (born 1 February 1958) is a Uruguayan football coach and former player. He most recently was the assistant manager of Uruguay national team.

He has played for Uruguay national team once, in a friendly against Colombia on 7 August 1988. He was also part of Uruguay's 1986 FIFA World Cup squad.

References

External links
  Profile

1958 births
Living people
Uruguayan footballers
Association football goalkeepers
Uruguay international footballers
1986 FIFA World Cup players
Footballers from Montevideo
Uruguayan Primera División players
Club Nacional de Football players
Racing Club de Montevideo players
Montevideo Wanderers F.C. players
C.A. Rentistas players